The Save Our Seas Foundation is a philanthropic organization committed to protecting the world’s oceans. It was founded in Geneva, Switzerland, on 23 September 2003.

Focusing primarily on charismatic threatened wildlife (endangered elasmobranchs, or sharks, rays and skates) and their habitats, the Save Our Seas Foundation supports cutting-edge research, conservation and education projects worldwide.

Background
Approximately 400 species of sharks are found in the world. They have inhabited our oceans for more than 500 million years, pre-dating the first dinosaurs by 100 million years, and they appear in every single ocean, playing a crucial role in the health of the marine ecosystems.

Due to threats such as overfishing, climate change, habitat loss and persecution, many shark populations have declined by more than 90%. Over 100 million sharks are killed annually in commercial fishing, resulting in such severe declines that more than a quarter of shark species and their relatives are considered Threatened or Near Threatened with extinction on the International Union for Conservation of Nature (IUCN).

Despite these declines, comparatively few shark species are listed under Appendix II of the Convention on International Trade in Endangered Species of Wild Fauna and Flora (CITES), which poses strict controls on the international trade in listed species. The first sharks to be included were basking and whale sharks in 2003, and by 2016 a total of 12 shark species and all manta and devil ray species were listed in Appendix II, as well as sawfishes species in Appendix I. In 2019 a further 18 species were added (mako sharks, guitarfishes and wedgefishes).

While progress has been made to improve the management and conservation of shark populations globally, more than 80% of the international shark fin trade that drives shark fisheries is unregulated. Most sharks and ray species are highly vulnerable to overfishing, as they grow slowly, mature late and live for a long time. They typically fulfil an important role as predators in their ecosystems, so the decline of shark populations is likely to have a cascading effect on the abundance and distribution of other species, threatening ecosystems and food supplies with unpredictable consequences.

Education and research centres

The Save Our Seas Foundation Shark Education Centre

Situated at the edge of False Bay in Cape Town, South Africa, the Save Our Seas Foundation Shark Education Centre was established in 2008 on the doorstep of the Dalebrook Marine Protected Area, a sanctuary zone within the greater Table Mountain National Park Marine Protected Area. The centre is open throughout the year for school and public visits.

The Save Our Seas Foundation D’Arros Research Centre

The Save Our Seas Foundation D’Arros Research Centre (SOSF-DRC) is based on D’Arros Island, 225 kilometres south-west of Mahé, in the Amirantes, Seychelles. D’Arros Island is separated from St Joseph Atoll by a channel one kilometre (0.6 mile) wide and 70 metres (230 feet) deep. The marine environment surrounding D’Arros Island and St Joseph Atoll boasts a diversity of habitats and species, providing an outstanding ocean observatory for scientific studies.

Since its inception in 2012, the centre has concluded numerous targeted research projects in collaboration with various international institutions. These diverse projects have focused mostly on threatened species such as sharks, turtles, seabirds, fish and corals, but have also included habitat assessments, feasibility surveys and oceanography.

The Save Our Seas Shark Research Center USA

The Save Our Seas Shark Research Center USA is located in Florida, US, and was established at Nova Southeastern University in 2009. Nova Southeastern University is also home to the Guy Harvey Research Institute and the Center of Excellence for Coral Reef Ecosystems Research, both of which conduct collaborative research with the Save Our Seas Shark Research Center.

It is specialises in taking integrative, multi-disciplinary approaches to research and conservation, which include combining high-tech genetics, genomics and field work to illuminate holistic aspects of shark and ray science that would be difficult to decipher using single-discipline approaches alone.

In February 2019, scientists decoded the genome of the white shark and discovered an astonishing insights that may explain why these sharks have survived over millennia. This discovery may have an impact on how we understand and manage human age-related diseases in the future.

Foundation grants

The Save Our Seas Foundation offers a series of grants dedicated mainly to projects on elasmobranchs (sharks, rays and skates). Most of these projects currently fall into the areas of research, conservation and education and are capable of attracting significant public attention, potentially increasing public and government awareness of the urgent need to protect the marine environment.

Sawfish, wedgefish and guitarfish are some of the most threatened species in the oceans, but little is known about them. Since 2017, the foundation has decided to focus on protecting this rare category of fishes.

Partners

The foundation has several long-term partners: the Manta Trust, the Bimini Biological Field Station Foundation, Shark Spotters, BC Whales, and the Acoustic Tracking Array Platform (ATAP). It provides funding and guidance for their projects, facilitates international cooperation among researchers and maintains an active communication link to forge a global conservation plan of action.

See also
List of sharks
List of threatened rays
List of threatened sharks
Marine conservation
Red List Index
Shark finning
Sustainability and environmental management
Sustainable fishery

References

External links
Save Our Seas Foundation website
The IUCN Red List of Threatened Species
Sustainable development Goal 14
The Official United Nations World Oceans Day Portal

Marine conservation organizations
Shark conservation